Vasyl Ivanovych Zinkevych (born 1 May 1945) is a Soviet and Ukrainian singer, actor, dancer and costume designer. Alongside Nazariy Yaremchuk, Sofia Rotaru and Volodymyr Ivasyuk, Zinkevych was one of the faces of the Ukrainian roots revival music of the 1970s. 

Zinkevych found his initial fame as the lead singer of the Ukrainian VIA Smerichka and as the lead actor in the 1970 film Chervona Ruta. His interpretations of Volodymyr Ivasyuk's songs "Chervona ruta", "Mila moya" and "Na shvidkih poïzdah" made him known all over the Soviet Union.  He was appointed a People's Artist of Ukraine in 1995, received the Ukrainian State Prize in 1994 and became a Hero of Ukraine in 2009. Several of Zinkevych songs, as well as some of his dance choreographies, made it to the "Golden Fund of Ukrainian artistry".

Biography

Early life
Zinkevych was born several days before the end of World War II in the village of Vas'kivtsi in western Ukraine. From a young age, Zinkevych loved drawing and wanted to become a metal worker. Zinkevych then went into required Soviet military service, first being stationed in Lviv and later in Czechoslovakia. During his service, as opposed to most of his colleagues, he became engaged in dancing rather than singing or playing music.

After completing military service, he moved to the tradition-rich Bukovina region, where he thought he could learn the craftmanship of metal work best. In 1968, he moved to Vyzhnytsia and was enrolled in the College of Applied Arts. He became involved in traditional dancing at the Dom kul'tury, the local cultural centre, in the dancing ensemble Smerchina. He also started to design and stitch national costumes.

Smerichka

Early years
Composer and musician Levko Dutkivsky started a VIA named Smerichka in 1967 in that same cultural centre as in which Zinkevych danced. However, the group's main lead singer moved away from Vyzhnytsia in 1966, leaving Dutkivsky to find a new singer. When Dutkivsky struggled to find a replacement, Vasyl Vaskov, the leader of the dance ensemble Smerchina, suggested Zinkevych. 

Dutkivsky taught Zinkevych to sing, and found himself pleasantly surprised by Zinkevych perseverance. However, when a local television station wanted to use a recorded version of Smerichka's song "Snizhynki padayut'", Zinkevych failed to deliver the version that Dutkivsky had desired. Television producer Vasyl Strihovych asked Dutkivsky to find another singer.

Eventually, this last version by Zinkevych was chosen over the version that Ivasyuk sang, with Ivasyuk also preferring Zinkevych's version to his own.

In 1969, Zinkevych proposed that Nazariy Yaremchuk should join the group, to which Dutkivsky agreed upon hearing the latter's singing voice.

Chervona Ruta and international recognition
In 1970, Zinkevych, without having any prior acting experience, was cast as the lead role of Boris in Chervona Ruta, one of the first Soviet television musicals. He played opposite to Sofia Rotaru, who played the female lead role Oksana. The film was debuted in 1971 and was a widespread success throughout the whole Soviet Union, but especially in Ukraine. In the film, Zinkevych sang several songs that became hits throughout Ukraine and most of the wider Soviet Union, such as "Mila moya" and "Chervona Ruta". For a long time, Zinkevych and Rotaru were miscredited to have sung "Vodohray" in the film, but the version that was played in the background was sung by Yaremchuk and Maria Isak. 

Due to the group's growing popularity, Smerichka was asked to perform a song during the first annual Pesnya goda in Moscow in 1971, alongside already established names such as Iosif Kobzon, Eduard Khil and Muslim Magomayev. In their Hutsul attire, Zinkevych and Yaremchuk looked very out of place in the Russian capital. The performance however was well-received by the audience and the clear confusion of the group, who was miscredited as "Semerichka", led to humour as well.

For most of the early 1970s, Yaremchuk and Zinkevych performed as a duet and as shared lead singers of Smerichka, with sometimes Yaremchuk and other times Zinkevych taking the lead vocals. Despite Yaremchuk's growing popularity, Zinkevych was not left hurt in his pride this time. According to a fellow Smerichka singer, Zinkevych treated Yaremchuk, who had already lost both his parents by age of 20 in 1971, as a younger brother.

Move to Lutsk and Chervona Ruta. 10 Years Since
In 1975, Zinkevych decided to leave Smerichka due to his inability to deal with the pressure of having to give up to four concerts a day. Zinkevych became the main singer of the VIA Svityaz. With this, he also moved away from the Bukovina and started living in Lutsk. In 1980, he also became the artistic director of the ensemble. For his work in the Ukrainian music, he received the title "Honoured Artist of the Ukrainian SSR" in 1978. 

In 1981, Zinkevych, Yaremchuk and Rotaru were featured in a short musical film, a spin-off from Chervona Ruta, titled Chervona Ruta. 10 Years Since. The film featured the artists separately reminiscing about the film and as well as presenting new songs. In the film, Zinkevych performed "Zabud' pechal' ".

Later years
After moving to Lutsk in 1975, Zinkevych had to deal with the loss of several of his former Smerichka colleagues, with Ivasyuk being found dead in 1979 and Yaremchuk dying of cancer in 1995. 

Since the independence of Ukraine, Zinkevych has received numerous medals for his longstanding contribution to the Ukrainian music. He was already award "People's Artist of the Ukrainian SSR" in 1986. In 1994, he received the Shevchenko National Prize alongside Ivasyuk, who received it posthumously. In 2009, Zinkevych became Hero of Ukraine and honorary citizen of his city Lutsk. Next to being a performer, Zinkevych also designed numerous national costumes throughout the decades.

Vasyl Zinkevych played a major role in the early steps of Ruslana's career, being among the first professional musicians to see her musical potential. In a 2004 interview, he referred to her as his "artistic daughter". 

In 2021, Zinkevych held a series of concerts in Palace of Ukraine in Kyiv.

Personal life
At some stage, Zinkevych married an unknown woman and had sons with her, Vasyl (1981) and Bohdan (1983). His wife left him not long after the birth of their sons, which led Zinkevych to be a single parent, which he suffered from emotionally. Both Zinkevych's sons were active in the Lutsk 1990s hip hop scene. Vasyl became one of the founding members of Tartak and performed at the 1997 Chervona Ruta festival, where their appearance led to controversy over a highly sexualised performance as well as their non-conventional dancing and singing. Vasyl Zinkevych himself was not charmed about his 17-year-old son's performance and forbade him from further participating in the group. 

For an artist of his status, Zinkevych leads a generally reclusive life and rarely lets journalists interview him. In comparison to his contemporaries as Sofia Rotaru and Nina Matviyenko, he rarely makes public appearances and treats the stage like a "church".

References

External links 
 Vasyl Zinkevych
 Vasyl Zinkevych «Золотий фонд української естради»

1945 births
Living people
People from Khmelnytskyi Oblast
20th-century Ukrainian male singers
Recipients of the title of Hero of Ukraine
Recipients of the Order of Prince Yaroslav the Wise, 4th class
Recipients of the Order of Prince Yaroslav the Wise, 5th class
21st-century Ukrainian male singers
Recipients of the Order of Merit (Ukraine), 1st class
Recipients of the Order of Merit (Ukraine), 2nd class
Recipients of the Order of Merit (Ukraine), 3rd class
Recipients of the Shevchenko National Prize